Bythiospeum pfeifferi is a species of very small freshwater snail that has an operculum, an aquatic gastropod mollusk in the family Hydrobiidae.

Distribution 
This species is endemic to Austria.

References

Hydrobiidae
Bythiospeum
Endemic fauna of Austria
Gastropods described in 1890
Taxonomy articles created by Polbot